Pravenec is a village and municipality in Prievidza District in the Trenčín Region of western Slovakia.

History
In historical records the village was first mentioned in 1267. Pravenec is thus one of the oldest settlements in the region and dates back to Great Moravia. Today it is composed of two parts separated by approximately 800 meters of grassland and forest. Located further north is the historical part with a renaissance manor-house protected by certificate of immunity as well as a baroque mansion. In the time period around 1640 Pravenec was part of the Bojnice lordship.

The new part of Pravenec was founded in the 1940s shortly after the Baťa woodworking factory was established.

Geography 
The municipality lies at an altitude of 325 metres and covers an area of 10.794 km². It has a population of about 1,241 people.

References

External links
 
 

Villages and municipalities in Prievidza District